Chase Carter (born June 10, 1997) is a Bahamian model. She has been on the cover of Maxim magazine.

Early life 
Carter was born to Mark and Denise Carter. Her grandfather is Sir Charles Carter, a radio broadcaster and former House of Assembly member.  She was a multi-sport athlete.

Career
Carter was scouted at the Sydney Airport when was 13. Carter is a rookie in the 2018 Sports Illustrated Swimsuit Issue. She has modeled for Pink (Victoria's Secret). She has also modeled for Polo Ralph Lauren, Maybelline, Philipp Plein. She has appeared in V and Galore magazines.

Personal life 
Carter has a sister named Tess and a brother.

In 2018 she dated New York Yankees outfielder Giancarlo Stanton. In 2020, she was reported to be dating Los Angeles Dodgers first baseman-outfielder Cody Bellinger. On July 13, 2021, she announced she and Bellinger are expecting their first child together, a girl, via Instagram. Their daughter was born in November 2021.

References

External links
 

Living people
1997 births
Bahamian models